Isabeli Bergossi Fontana (born 4 July 1983) is a Brazilian model known for her work with brands like Victoria's Secret.

Early life
Fontana was born in Curitiba, Paraná, Brazil, to Maribel Bergossi and Antonio Carlos Fontana. She is of Italian descent, and states that a grandmother had some Portuguese roots. At just 13 years of age she made it to the finals of the 1996 Elite Model Look. The following year she moved from Brazil to Milan, Italy.

Career
She has been in a number of runway shows since the early 2000s along with supermodels Gisele Bündchen, Carmen Kass, Angela Lindvall, Ana Beatriz Barros, Julia Stegner, Izabel Goulart among others.

In 1999, at the age of 16, she appeared in the Victoria's Secret lingerie catalogue. The shoot caused controversy, as Victoria's Secret stated that they would not use models younger than 18. Soon after the Victoria's Secret shoot, she was signed by Versace, Ralph Lauren and Valentino.

Since 1999 she has modeled for Sports Illustrated Swimsuit Issue, Marie Claire, ELLE, Vogue, Harper's Bazaar, Numéro, i-D, Arena and many others.

Fontana has been the face of a variety of advertising campaigns including Shiatzy Chen, Armani Jeans, Chanel, Bulgari, Colcci, Disritmia, Dolce and Gabbana, Emporio Armani, Enrique Martinez, Escada, H&M, Helena Rubinstein, Hugo Boss, Hussein Chalayan, Leonisa, Massimo Dutti, Mango M. Officer, Nicole Farhi, Oscar de la Renta, Peter Hahn, Philips, Ralph Lauren, Revlon, Roberto Cavalli, Rosa Chá, Saks Fifth Avenue, Tommy Hilfiger, Triton, Valentino, Versace, Victoria's Secret, Vivara and others. Photographed by Steven Meisel, she was presented on the September 2004 cover of American Vogue as one of the "Models of the Moment". She featured as a 'Face of the Moment' in May 2009's US Vogue. 

Fontana can be seen in the spring/summer 2011 campaigns for Escada, Dolce and Gabbana, Uniqlo and Ann Taylor.

Fontana had been the face of Viktor & Rolf's fragrance Flowerbomb in 2014 as well as Bvlgari's Goldea from 2015.

In 2008, Fontana made her debut on the Forbes The World's 15 Top-Earning Models list at place 11, having earned $3 million.

She has appeared in the Pirelli Calendar on a number of occasions, including in the 2011 calendar, which features models posing as Greek and Roman gods, photographed by Karl Lagerfeld.

In 2011, she was part of the Miss Universe 2011 judging panel.

Personal life
In her youth, Fontana attended a Catholic school in the Portão district of Curitiba. She is often seen making the sign of the cross in footage. Nevertheless, she is a non-practicing Roman Catholic. She was married to model Álvaro Jacomossi but they divorced in 2004. Their son, Zion, was born in 2003. Fontana married actor and model Henri Castelli on 10 December 2005, and their son, Lucas, was born on 23 October 2006 in São Paulo. Fontana and Castelli divorced in 2007. She was engaged to Rohan Marley but the engagement ended in early 2013. In 2021 she gained Italian citizenship due to her Italian ancestry.

Filmography

References

External links

 Askmen.com profile

1983 births
Living people
People from Curitiba
Brazilian people of Italian descent
Brazilian people of Portuguese descent
Brazilian female models
Brazilian Roman Catholics
Citizens of Italy through descent
Women Management models